Vengappally  is a village in Wayanad district in the state of Kerala, India.

Demographics
 India census, Vengappally had a population of 10995 with 5413 males and 5582 females.

Transport
Distance (in km) to some major destinations from Vengapplly:
Kozhikode (79)
Mysore (137)
Ooty (121)
Madikeri (119)
Bangalore (275)
Cochin (275)
Sulthan Bathery (32)
Kalpetta (7) 
The nearest major airport is at Calicut. The road to the east connects to Mysore and Bangalore. Night journey is allowed on this sector as it goes through Bandipur national forest. The nearest railway station is Mysore.  There are airports at Bangalore and Calicut.

Shamsul Ulama Academy

Shamsul Ulama Islamic Academy (مجمع شمس العلماء الإسلامي) is an Islamic educational institution in Vengappally. It was established by the SKSSF Wayanad District Committee under the presidency of late District Qasi Panakkad Sayed Umerali Shihab Thangal in the year 2002 to promote Islamic educational activities. SUIA is managed by president Sayed Hyderali Shihab Thangal Panakkad.

References

Villages in Wayanad district
Kalpetta area